The Berea–Biddle Street Historic District is a national historic district in Baltimore, Maryland, United States.  It is located in the far eastern part of the historic city bounds, and is roughly bounded by the Edison Highway, Federal Street, North Rose Street, and the railroad tracks of the Penn Central Railroad.  This area was one of the last to be developed within the city's 1851 boundaries, and consists mainly of two-story rowhouses built between about 1890 and 1925.  The centerpiece of the district is the St. Katherine of Sienna Roman Catholic church and school complex.

Berea–Biddle Street is historically significant due to its association with the immigrant history of Baltimore, in particular the Bohemian/Czechoslovakian immigrants who began settling in the area during the 1870s and 1880s. By the early 1900s, many of the Czech immigrants had relocated northeast to access more modern and spacious housing. Many Irish and Italian immigrants also lived in the neighborhood during the late 1800s and early 1900s.

The district was added to the National Register of Historic Places in 2014.

See also
National Register of Historic Places listings in East and Northeast Baltimore

References

Czech-American culture in Baltimore
East Baltimore
Historic districts on the National Register of Historic Places in Baltimore
Irish-American culture in Baltimore
Italian-American culture in Baltimore
Slovak-American culture in Maryland